Tooheys is a brewery in the suburb of Lidcombe, in Sydney, Australia. It produces beers and ciders under the Tooheys and Hahn Brewery trademarks, and is part of the Lion beverages group which was acquired by the Japanese Kirin Company in 2009.

History
Tooheys dates from 1869, when John Thomas Toohey (an Irish immigrant to Melbourne) obtained his brewing licence. Toohey and his brother James Matthew ran pubs in Melbourne (The Limerick Arms and The Great Britain) before moving to Sydney in the 1860s. They commenced brewing Tooheys Black Old Ale in a brewery in the area of present-day Darling Harbour. By 1875, demand for their beer had soared and they established The Standard Brewery in inner-city Surry Hills. In 1902, the company went public as Tooheys Limited, and commenced brewing lager (the present-day Tooheys New) in 1930. In 1955, the brewery moved west to Lidcombe. In 1967, Tooheys bought competitor Miller's Brewers located in Taverner's Hill, closing that brewery in 1975.

In March 1980, Tooheys merged with Castlemaine Perkins to form Castlemaine Tooheys. Bond Corporation purchased Castlemaine Tooheys in 1985.

Castlemaine Tooheys were represented as the appellants in the landmark 1990 case of Castlemaine Tooheys Ltd v South Australia, heard by the High Court of Australia. Since the brewery operated outside South Australia, but sold its products there, a South Australian Act Amendment, imposing a substantial refund value for non-refillable bottles produced in other states, was ruled to be inconsistent with section 92 of the Constitution of Australia. Due to the significant discriminatory and protectionist financial impacts that they faced, Castlemaine Tooheys successfully invalidated the law.

Lion Nathan acquired a 50% stake in Bond's Natbrew Holdings in 1990, and took total ownership in 1992. Production of Hahn-branded beers was moved from the Camperdown Hahn Brewery to Tooheys, some time between 1993 (Lion's acquisition of Hahn) and 1999 (when Hahn Brewery was renamed Malt Shovel Brewery).  

Products sold under the Tooheys trademark are brewed at Tooheys Brewery. Home-brew kits are distributed by Lion and produced at Canterbury Brewery.

Sponsorships
, the Tooheys brand was the major sponsor of rugby union in New South Wales and Queensland. It was naming rights sponsor of the Bathurst 1000 from 1988 until 1995 and the Melbourne Cup from 2001 until 2003.

The Tooheys Challenge Cup was a rugby league competition that ran in the 1990s sponsored by the company. Tooheys remains the principal beer partner of the New South Wales Rugby League team in State of Origin, appearing on the team's jersey sleeves and shorts.

Current beers
 Tooheys New is a pale lager, first brewed in 1930.
 Tooheys Old is a dark ale, supposedly similar to the Toohey brothers' original brew.
 Tooheys Extra Dry is a dry style lager, available on tap and in bottles.
 Red Bitter  was formerly known as Tooheys Red, 4.0 to 4.2% ABV
 Gold Bitter  was formerly Tooheys Gold, mid-strength, 3.0% ABV
 Blue Bitter  was formerly Tooheys Blue, a low-alcohol "lite" version, 2.3% ABV
 Hahn Premium Light was launched in 1998.
 Hahn Super Dry was launched in October 2006.

Discontinued beers
 Tooheys Flag Ale

 Hahn Premium, a German-style lager, was launched in 1988.
 Tooheys Country Special
 Tooheys Blue Ice
 Tooheys Amber Bitter
 Tooheys 2.2 Lite
Tooheys Classic
 MeZ
 Tooheys Extra Dry Platinum, launched in 2007, is a beer with increased alcohol content of 6.5%.
 Tooheys Pils is a pale lager, launched in 1998.
 Tooheys New White Stag is a low-carb beer launched in 2008.
 Tooheys Darling Pale Ale

Ciders
launched in 2009.

 Tooheys 5 Seeds Cider
 Tooheys 5 Seeds Cloudy Apple Cider
 Tooheys 5 Seeds Sour Apple Cider
 Tooheys 5 Seeds Crisp Apple Cider

See also

Australian pub
Beer in Australia
List of breweries in Australia
List of cider brands

References

Notes

Bibliography

Other references
 
 
 

Australian beer brands
Beer brewing companies based in New South Wales
Kirin Group
Manufacturing companies based in Sydney
Manufacturing companies established in 1869
1869 establishments in Australia
Culture of New South Wales
Brands of cider